Masilo Michael Modubi (born 22 April 1985, in Polokwane) is a South African footballer. He currently serves as manager for Belgian  club KESK Leopoldsburg. He spent an eight-year spell at Belgian club Westerlo and then three years at Dessel Sport.

Trivia 
He began his career 1992 by Real Gunners later in January 1995 moved to Ria Stars, from the Pietersburg based team was 1996 scouted from Transnet Sport School of Excellence in 2003 was sold to Chelsea F.C. in England. The London-based club sold him in July 2003 to K.V.C. Westerlo.

References

 Player info at the official VC Westerlo website
 

1985 births
Living people
South African soccer players
South African expatriate soccer players
K.V.C. Westerlo players
Association football midfielders
Chelsea F.C. players
Ria Stars F.C. players
K.F.C. Dessel Sport players
Belgian Pro League players
Expatriate footballers in Belgium
South Africa international soccer players